The Colorado Snowsports Hall of Fame is a hall of fame for notable figures in skiing and snowboarding, including athletes, sport builders,  and inspirations.

Inductees
1977 - Frank Ashley, George Cranmer, Charles Minot Dole, Father John Lewis Dyer, Thor Groswold, Carl Howelsen, Fred Iselin, Albert Johnson, Alvin Wegeman, Wallace Werner.
1978 - Robert Balch, Frank Bulkley, Anders Haugen, Barney McLean, Marcellus Merrill, Walter Paepcke, Peter Prestrud, Evelyn Runnette, Willy Schaeffler, Lowell Thomas, Gordon Wren.
1979 - Fred Bellmar, Stephen Bradley, D.R.C. Brown, Lewis Dalpes, Graeme McGowan, Ed Taylor, Sven Wiik.

 1986 - Bob Beattie, Billy Kidd, Bill Marolt

References

External links
 

Halls of fame in Colorado
Skiing organizations
Ski museums and halls of fame
Snowboarding in the United States
Skiing in Colorado